Ahmad Hassan Abdullah (born Albert Chepkurui on July 29, 1981 in Kaptarakwa, Kenya) is a long-distance and cross country runner, now representing Qatar after his switch from Kenya in 2003. Other runners who have made the same switch include Saif Saeed Shaheen.

Abdullah has won bronze medals at the 2005 IAAF World Cross Country Championships and the 2004 and 2008 editions of the IAAF World Half Marathon Championships. He represented Qatar over 10,000 metres at the 2008 Beijing Olympics and three times at the IAAF World Championships in Athletics. He is a two-time Asian champion in the 10,000 m (2003 and 2007) and holds the Asian record with his personal best time of 26:38.76 minutes.

Career
Abdullah has competed numerous times at the IAAF World Cross Country Championships. He made his first appearance as a junior athlete at the 1999 race, finishing in fifth place. In the senior section, he was sixth in the 2001 short race and 2002 long race, before missing 2003 amid his switch to represent Qatar. He returned in 2004 to take fourth in the short race. In 2005 he race in both races and was the long race bronze medallist and eighth in the short race. He performed less well after that, with finishes ranging from eighth to 18th in the period from 2006 to 2010.

He has enjoyed success at the Asian Cross Country Championships, winning the individual and team gold medals at the 2007 and 2009 competitions. He won both the individual and team titles at the 2008 edition of the World Military Cross Country Championships. He has competed on the Spanish cross country circuit and won the Cross Zornotza in 2005.

On the track Abdullah has typically competed in the 10,000 m. He holds the Asian and Qatari records for the distance with his personal best of 26:38.76 minutes, set at the Memorial Van Damme meeting in 2003. He was the bronze medallist in the event at the 2001 Goodwill Games, In his first outings as a Qatari athlete he came fourth in the 10,000 m at the 2003 World Championships in Athletics, before taking the regional title in the event at the 2003 Asian Athletics Championships. At the 2007 Asian Athletics Championships, he won a second Asian title and also a silver medal over 5000 metres behind his compatriot Felix Kibore. He ran at the 2007 World Championships in Athletics, but did not manage to finish. On his Olympic debut at the 2008 Beijing Olympics he came eighth in the 10,000 m and was the only runner in the top ten to represent a non-African nation. He was eleventh at the 2009 World Championships in Athletics, then was only a bronze medallist at the 2009 Asian Athletics Championships, as he was beaten by two other former Kenyans, Nicholas Kemboi and Hasan Mahboob.

At the IAAF World Half Marathon Championships he has competed three times and reached the podium twice. He was third in 2004, 24th in 2007 and took a second bronze medal at the 2008 race. On the road circuit, he was the 2003 winner of the Bellin Run.

After a break from international competition lasting from late 2010 through 2011, Abdullah made his marathon debut in 2012 at the Hamburg Marathon and finished the race in a time of 2:08:36 hours, coming fifth overall.

International competitions

Personal bests
3000 metres - 7:43.01 min (1999)
5000 metres - 12:56.27 min (2003)
10,000 metres - 26:38.76 min (2003)
Half marathon - 1:01:46 hrs (2007)
Marathon - 2:08:36 hrs (2012)

See also
List of eligibility transfers in athletics
List of Qatar-related topics

References

External links

1981 births
Living people
People from Elgeyo-Marakwet County
Kenyan male long-distance runners
Kenyan male cross country runners
Kenyan male marathon runners
Qatari male long-distance runners
Qatari male marathon runners
Qatari male cross country runners
Olympic male long-distance runners
Olympic athletes of Qatar
Athletes (track and field) at the 2008 Summer Olympics
Asian Games competitors for Qatar
Athletes (track and field) at the 2006 Asian Games
Goodwill Games medalists in athletics
Competitors at the 2001 Goodwill Games
World Athletics Championships athletes for Qatar
Asian Cross Country Championships winners
Kenyan emigrants to Qatar
Naturalised citizens of Qatar
Qatari people of Kenyan descent